The 1824 Ohio gubernatorial election was held on October 12, 1824. The election was a rematch of 1822, with only the top two contenders returning. Incumbent Governor Morrow and Speaker of the Senate Trimble, who also served as acting Governor in 1822, both increased their vote share, lacking any other challengers. In this election, the two candidates agreed on the major issues, including support for a public school system and the development of internal improvements.

This was the last gubernatorial election that the Democratic-Republicans won in Ohio. About a month later, Henry Clay would win Ohio in the Presidential election over Jackson and Adams, with both Morrow and Trimble joining his Whig Party.

General election

Results

References

1824
Ohio
Gubernatorial
October 1824 events